Sha Tin Racecourse is one of the two racecourses for horse racing in Hong Kong. It is located in Sha Tin in the New Territories. It is managed by Hong Kong Jockey Club.

Penfold Park is encircled by the track, and the Hong Kong Sports Institute is located immediately south of the property.

Michael Jackson planned to perform at the racecourse on his Dangerous World Tour, which was the start of the third leg, but was cancelled due to the conflict of the racing season.

History
It was built in 1978 (under the administration of Sir David Akers-Jones, the then-Secretary for the New Territories) on reclaimed land and is the larger of the two tracks in Hong Kong.

The course has 474 races per season including:
 Hong Kong Cup
 Hong Kong Mile
 Hong Kong Sprint
 Hong Kong Vase
 Centenary Sprint Cup
 Hong Kong Stewards' Cup
 Queen's Silver Jubilee Cup
 Hong Kong Gold Cup
 Hong Kong Derby
 Queen Elizabeth II Cup
 Champions Mile
 Chairman's Sprint Prize
 Hong Kong Champions & Chater Cup

On 9 September 2007, the Sha Tin track opened for the 2007 season with an opening day record of about 60,000. Chief Secretary Henry Tang struck the ceremonial gong. The Hong Kong Jockey Club collected US$106 million in bets (the highest since 2001). Children of horse owners were admitted amid protest of local anti-gambling groups. Sunny Power, booted by Howard Cheng won in the 1,200 metre dash.

Features
Originally built with a 35,000-capacity grandstand, it now has two grandstands with a total capacity of 85,000. It also has 20 stables for a capacity of 1,260 horses.

Other features include:

Equine Hospital
Racing Laboratory
Equine Swimming Pool
Riverside Gallop

Track Specifications:
 Turf
 Straight: 
 Circumference: 
 All-Weather Track (Dirt)
 Straight: 
 Circumference:

Major races

 Group One

 Hong Kong International Races (December)
 Hong Kong Cup - 2000m
 Hong Kong Mile - 1600m
 Hong Kong Sprint - 1200m
 Hong Kong Vase - 2400m
 Hong Kong Triple Crown
 Hong Kong Stewards' Cup - 1600m (January)
 Hong Kong Gold Cup - 2000m (February)
 Hong Kong Champions & Chater Cup - 2400m (May)
 Centenary Sprint Cup - 1200m (January)
 Queen's Silver Jubilee Cup - 1400m (February)
 Queen Elizabeth II Cup - 2000m (April)
 Champions Mile - 1600m (April)
 Chairman's Sprint Prize - 1200m (April)

Group Two
 Premier Bowl - 1200m (October)
 Sha Tin Trophy - 1600m (October)
 Jockey Club Day (November)
 Jockey Club Cup - 2000m
 Jockey Club Mile - 1600m
 Jockey Club Sprint - 1200m
 Chairman's Trophy - 1600m (April)
 Sprint Cup - 1200m (April)

Group Three
 Celebration Cup - 1400m (October)
 National Day Cup - 1000m (October)
 Ladies' Purse - 1800m (November)
 Chinese Club Challenge Cup - 1400m (January)
 Bauhinia Sprint Trophy - 1000m (January)
 Centenary Vase - 1600m (February)
 Queen Mother Memorial Cup - 2400m (May)
 Sha Tin Vase - 1200m (May)
 Lion Rock Trophy - 1600m (May)
 Premier Cup - 1400m (June)
 Premier Plate - 1800m (June)

 Listed Race
 Four-year-old Series (4YO Classic Series)
 Hong Kong Classic Mile - 1600m (January)
 Hong Kong Classic Cup - 1800m (February)
 Hong Kong Derby - 2000m (March; since 1979)

Transport
The racecourse is served by Racecourse station of the Mass Transit Railway (MTR). The station is only used on racing days. There are also several bus routes. One of the racecourse bus routes, KMB 872, had a deadly bus crash.

References

External links

Hong Kong Jockey Club official website
Shatin Racecourse

1978 establishments in Hong Kong
Event venues established in 1978
Extra areas operated by NT taxis
Horse racing venues in Hong Kong
Landmarks in Hong Kong
Sha Tin District
Tourist attractions in Hong Kong